Sergio Manente (10 December 1924 – 14 March 1993) was an Italian professional football player and coach who played as a defender.

Honours
Juventus
 Serie A champion: 1949–50, 1951–52.

External links
 

1924 births
1993 deaths
Italian footballers
Italy international footballers
Serie A players
Udinese Calcio players
Atalanta B.C. players
Juventus F.C. players
L.R. Vicenza players
Italian football managers
Udinese Calcio managers
Treviso F.B.C. 1993 managers
U.S. Alessandria Calcio 1912 managers
Venezia F.C. managers
Association football defenders